Albert Edward Pelling (18 October 1903 – 1977) was a British fencer. He competed at the 1936 and 1948 Summer Olympics. He was a three times British fencing champion, winning the épée title at the British Fencing Championships in 1933, 1934 and 1951.

References

1903 births
1977 deaths
British male fencers
Olympic fencers of Great Britain
Fencers at the 1936 Summer Olympics
Fencers at the 1948 Summer Olympics
People from Wandsworth
Sportspeople from London